Stoner is a 1965 novel by the American writer John Williams. It was reissued in 1972 by Pocket Books, in 2003 by Vintage and in 2006 by New York Review Books Classics with an introduction by John McGahern.

Stoner has been categorized under the genre of the academic novel, or the campus novel. Stoner follows the life of the eponymous William Stoner, his undistinguished career and workplace politics, marriage to his wife, Edith, affair with his colleague, Katherine, and his love and pursuit of literature.

Despite receiving little attention upon its publication in 1965, Stoner has seen a sudden surge of popularity and critical praise since its republication in the 2000s, championed by authors such as Julian Barnes, Ian McEwan, Bret Easton Ellis and John McGahern.

Plot
William Stoner is born on a small farm in 1891. One day his father suggests he should attend the University of Missouri to study agriculture. Stoner agrees but, while studying a compulsory literature course, he quickly falls in love with literary studies. Without telling his parents, Stoner quits the agriculture program and studies only the humanities. He completes his MA in English and begins teaching. In graduate school, he is friendly with fellow students Gordon Finch and Dave Masters. World War I begins, and Gordon and Dave enlist. Despite pressure from Gordon, Stoner decides to remain in school during the war. Masters is killed in France, while Finch sees action and becomes an officer. At a faculty party, Stoner meets and becomes infatuated with a young woman named Edith, who is staying with an aunt for a few weeks. Stoner woos Edith, and she agrees to marry him.

Stoner’s marriage to Edith is bad from the start. It gradually becomes clear that Edith has profound emotional problems. Significantly, she is bitter about having cancelled a trip to Europe with her aunt to marry Stoner. After three years of marriage, Edith suddenly informs Stoner that she wants a baby. She suddenly becomes passionate sexually, but this period is brief. When their daughter Grace is born, Edith remains bedridden for nearly a year, and Stoner largely cares for their child alone. He grows close with his young daughter, who spends most of her time with him in his study. Stoner gradually realizes that Edith is waging a campaign to separate him from his daughter emotionally. For the most part, Stoner accepts Edith's mistreatment. He begins to teach with more enthusiasm, but still, year in and year out, his marriage with Edith remains perpetually unsatisfactory and fraught. Grace becomes an unhappy, secretive child who smiles and laughs often but is emotionally hollow.

At the University, Finch becomes the acting dean of the faculty. Stoner feels compelled by his conscience to fail a student named Charles Walker. He is a close protégé of a colleague, Professor Hollis Lomax, and like him is physically disabled. The student is clearly dishonest and cannot fulfil the requirements of Stoner's course but, despite this, the decision to expel or retain Walker is put on hold. After his promotion to head of the department, Lomax takes every opportunity to exact revenge upon Stoner throughout the rest of his career. A collaboration between Stoner and a younger instructor in the department, Katherine Driscoll, develops into a romantic love affair. Ironically, after the affair begins, Stoner’s relationships with Edith and Grace also improve. At some point, Edith finds out about the affair, but does not seem to mind it. When Lomax learns about it, however, he begins to put pressure on Katherine, who also teaches in the English department. Stoner and Driscoll agree it best to end the affair so as not to derail the academic work they both feel called to follow. Katherine quietly slips out of town, never to be seen by him again.

Eventually, Stoner, older now and hard of hearing, is beginning to become a legendary figure in the English department despite Lomax's opposition. He begins to spend more time at home, ignoring Edith's signs of displeasure at his presence. Entering adulthood, Grace enrolls at the University of Missouri. The following year, Grace announces she is pregnant and marries the father of her child. Grace’s husband enlists in the army and dies before the baby is born. Grace goes to St. Louis with the baby to live with her husband's parents. She visits Stoner and Edith occasionally, and Stoner realizes that Grace has developed a drinking problem.

As Stoner’s life is coming to an end, his daughter Grace comes to visit him. Deeply unhappy and addicted to alcohol, Grace halfheartedly tries to reconcile with Stoner, and he sees that his daughter, like her mother, will never be happy. When Grace leaves, Stoner feels as though the young child that he loved died long ago. Stoner thinks back over his life. He thinks about where he failed, and wonders if he could have been more loving to Edith, if he could have been stronger, or if he could have helped her more. Later, he believes that he is wrong to think of himself as a failure. During an afternoon when he is alone, he sees various young students passing by on their way to class outside his window, and he dies, dropping his copy of the one book that he published years earlier as a young professor.

Characters
The novel focuses on William Stoner and the central figures in his life. Those who become his enemies are used as tools against him who separate Stoner from his loves. New Yorker contributor Tim Kreider describes their depictions as "evil marked with deformity."
 William Stoner: The novel's main character, called "Stoner" throughout the book, is a farm boy turned English professor. He uses his love of literature to deal with his unfulfilling home life.
 Edith Bostwick Stoner: Stoner's wife, a neurotic woman, is from a strict and sheltered upbringing. Stoner falls in love with the idea of her, but soon realizes that she is bitter and has been so long before they were married.
 Grace Stoner: Stoner and Edith's only child, Grace is easily influenced by her mother. Edith keeps Grace away from and against her father as a sort of "punishment" for Stoner, because of the couple's failing relationship.
 Gordon Finch: Stoner's colleague and only real ally and friend, he has known Stoner since their graduate school days, and becomes the dean of the college of Arts and Sciences. His affable and outgoing demeanor contrasts with that of Stoner.
 David Masters: Stoner's friend from graduate school, he is killed in action during the Great War, but his words have a continuing impact on Stoner's worldview.
 Archer Sloane: Stoner's teacher and mentor growing up, he inspired Stoner to leave agriculture behind and begin studying English literature. He is old and ailing by the time Stoner is hired at the university. 
 Hollis Lomax: Sloane's "replacement" at the university, Stoner and he began as friends, but Stoner eventually sees him as an "enemy". Stoner and Lomax do not see eye-to-eye in their work life. He is described as a hunchback.
 Charles Walker: Lomax's crippled mentee, he is an arrogant and duplicitous young man who uses rhetorical flourish to mask his scholarly ineptitude. He also becomes an enemy to Stoner.
 Katherine Driscoll: A younger teacher, she has an affair with Stoner. University politics and circumstantial differences keep them from continuing the relationship.

Themes
In the novel's introduction, John McGahern says Stoner is a "novel about work." This includes not only traditional work, such as Stoner's life on the farm and his career as a professor, but also the work one puts into life and relationships.

One of the central themes in the novel is the manifestation of passion. Stoner's passions manifest themselves into failures, as proven by the bleak end of his life. Stoner has two primary passions: knowledge and love. According to Morris Dickstein, "he fails at both." Love is also a widely recognized theme in Stoner. The novel's representation of love moves beyond romance; it highlights the bliss and suffering that can be qualities of love. Both Stoner and Lomax discovered a love of literature early in their lives, and it is this love that ultimately endures throughout Stoner's life. Another of the novel's central themes is the social reawakening, which is closely linked to the sexual reawakening, of the protagonist. After the loss of his wife and daughter, Stoner seeks fulfillment elsewhere, as in his affair with Katherine Driscoll.

Edwin Frank, the editor at NYRB Classics responsible for the 2005 reissue of the novel, suggests that Stoner contains many existential elements. "I don’t think it’s a mistake to hear Camus behind it," Frank suggests, "this story of a lone man against the world choosing his life, such as it is. I sometimes say the book[']s a bit like an Edward Hopper painting, wooden houses casting stark shadows on blank green lawns."

Style

John McGahern's Introduction to Stoner and Adam Foulds of The Independent praise Williams' prose for its cold, factual plainness. Foulds claims that Stoner has a "flawless narrative rhythm [that] flows like a river." Williams' prose has also been applauded for its clarity, by both McGahern and Charlotte Heathcote of The Daily Express. In an interview with the BBC, author Ian McEwan calls Williams' prose "authoritative". Sarah Hampson of The Globe and Mail writes that Williams' "description of petty academic politics reads like the work of someone taking surreptitious notes at dreary faculty meetings." Her review also found Stoner "quietly beautiful and moving" and "precisely constructed." Another review found that "Williams's gift for emotional precision" ... "elevates one man's story ... into something universal."

Background

John Williams' life was similar to that of his character in Stoner. He was an English professor at the University of Denver until he retired in 1985. Like Stoner, he experienced coworker frustrations in the academic world and was devoted to this work, making his novel a reflection of parts of his own life, though in the preface to the novel Williams states that it is entirely "a work of fiction" and bears no resemblance to any people or events he experienced in his time at the University of Missouri.

The life of academic poet J. V. Cunningham also seems to have partially inspired the novel.

Reception

In 1963 Williams' own publisher questioned Stoner'''s potential to gain popularity and become a bestseller. On its 1965 publication there were a handful of glowing reviews such as The New Yorker's of June 12, 1965, which praised Williams for creating a character who is dedicated to his work but cheated by the world. Those who gave positive feedback pointed to the truthful voice with which Williams wrote about life's conditions, and they often compared Stoner to his other work, Augustus, in characters and plot direction. Irving Howe and C. P. Snow also praised the novel. However, sales of the novel did not reflect these positive commentaries. It sold fewer than 2000 copies, and was out of print a year later. 

It was then reissued as a mass-market paperback in 1972 by Pocket Books, reissued again in 1998 by the University of Arkansas Press and then in 2003 in paperback by Vintage and 2006 by New York Review Books Classics. French novelist Anna Gavalda translated Stoner in 2011 and in 2013, sales to distributors tripled. It was not until several years later during Stoner’s republication that the book became better known. After being republished and translated into several languages, the novel "sold hundreds of thousands of copies in 21 countries".

Williams' novel has been praised for both its narrative and stylistic aspects. In a 2007 review of the recently reissued work, scholar and book critic Morris Dickstein acclaims the writing technique as remarkable and says the novel "takes your breath away". Bryan Appleyard's review quotes critic D.G. Myers as saying that the novel was a good book for beginners in the world of "serious literature". Another critic, author Alex Preston, writes that the novel describes "a small life ... in a small, precise way: the dead hand of realism." In 2010, critic Mel Livatino noted that, in "nearly fifty years of reading fiction, I have never encountered a more powerful novel—and not a syllable of it sentimental." Steve Almond reviewed Stoner in The New York Times Magazine in 2014. Almond claims Stoner focuses on the "capacity to face the truth of who we are in private moments" and questions whether any of us is truly able to say we are able to do that. Almond states, "I devoured it in one sitting. I had never encountered a work so ruthless in its devotion to human truths and so tender in its execution." Sarah Hampson of The Globe and Mail sees Stoner as an "antidote" to a 21st-century culture of entitlement. She says that the novel came back to public attention at a time when people felt entitled to personal fulfillment, at the cost of their own morality, and Stoner shows that there can be value even in a life that seems failed. In 2013 it was named Waterstones Book of the Year and The New Yorker called it "the greatest American novel you've never heard of." Writing in The Washington Post in 2015, literary critic Elaine Showalter was less enthusiastic, noting that she, "along with other female readers, [was] put off by Williams’s misogyny" and found fault with Williams' portrayal of Stoner as "a blameless martyr, rather than a man with choices."

Adaptations
In 2015, a film adaptation of the novel was reportedly in production by Blumhouse Productions, Cohen Media Group and Film4. Casey Affleck is set to star as Stoner. As of February 2020, the film had still not entered production.

References

External links
"The Greatest American Novel You've Never Heard of". The New Yorker''
Discussion of "Stoner" and the techniques of literary realism
Sonnet 73 with notes, pictures and a summary at shakespeare-navigators.com

1965 American novels
Novels set in Columbia, Missouri
Viking Press books
Campus novels
NYRB Classics
Third-person narrative novels
Novels set in the 1910s